People whose surname is or was Dibdin include:

 Charles Dibdin (1745–1814), British writer and musician
 Charles Dibdin the younger (1768–1833), English dramatist, composer and theatre proprietor
 Lewis Tonna Dibdin (1852–1938) British lawyer and Dean of the Arches
 Michael Dibdin (1947–2007), British crime writer
 Thomas Frognall Dibdin (1776–1847), British bibliographer
 Thomas John Dibdin (1771–1841), British dramatist
 British politician Michael Heseltine, whose middle name is Dibdin, is a distant descendant of Charles Dibdin.